Sam Waters or Samuel Waters may refer to:

People
Sam Waters (footballer), for Sligo Rovers F.C.
Samuel Waters, first recorded European settler in Hyndman, Pennsylvania

Fiction
Sam Waters, a character in the 1921 film Action
Sam Waters, a character in the 1993 TV film I Can Make You Love Me
Samantha "Sam" Waters, a character in the TV series Profiler
Samantha "Sam" Waters, a crossover character in the TV series The Pretender
Samantha "Sam" Booke Waters, a character in the TV series Brothers

See also
Sam Watters (born 1970), American musician
Sam Walters (disambiguation)
Samantha Waters (disambiguation)